Khalifa bin Salman Al Khalifa  (24 November 1935 – 11 November 2020) was a Bahraini royal and politician who served as the Prime Minister of Bahrain from 10 January 1970 until his death in 2020. He took office over a year before Bahrain's independence on 15 August 1971. He was the longest-serving prime minister in the world. Under the 2002 Constitution he lost some of his powers, with the King now having the authority to appoint and (along with the Bahraini parliament) dismiss ministers.

Prince Khalifa was also the paternal uncle of the reigning King Hamad bin Isa Al Khalifa and grand-uncle of the Crown Prince Salman, since he was the younger brother of the previous Emir Isa bin Salman Al Khalifa.

Early life and education

Prince Khalifa was born on 24 November 1935, the second son of Salman ibn Hamad Al Khalifa, Hakim of Bahrain, and his wife Mouza bint Hamad Al Khalifa. He was educated at Manama High School and the Rifa’a Palace School in Bahrain.

Career 
Prince Khalifa was a member of the education council from 1956 to 1958 and chair between 1958 and 1961. Next he became the director of the finance department (1961–1966), president of the electricity board (1961), chair of the Manama municipal council (1962–1967), head of the Bahrain monetary council (1964), chair of the joint committee for economic and financial studies, committee member for the register of commerce, then chairman of the administrative affairs council (1967–1969), became board member of the Bahrain monetary agency and then chairperson of the State Council (1972–1974), head of the State Council (1972), and head of the supreme defence council (1977).

Prince Khalifa was appointed as prime minister by his brother Emir Isa bin Salman Al Khalifa, in 1971. Therefore, he was assigned the control of government and economy, while his brother, the Emir, was involved in diplomatic and ceremonial affairs. Prince Khalifa received a World Peace Culture Award on 6 August 2017.

Prince Khalifa is the founder of the Housing Ministry, and he reformed the Central Bank of Bahrain. 
During his premiership he was the head of the Oil and Economic Policy Council.

Views
In 2011, reporter Bill Law stated that Prince Khalifa was a hardliner, whereas Crown Prince Salman, his grandnephew who is also deputy prime minister, was a reformer and the King was somewhere in the middle of the two.

Marriage and children
Prince Khalifa married his cousin Hessa bint Ali Al Khalifa, the fourth daughter of Ali bin Hamad Al Khalifa in Muharraq. They had three sons and one daughter:
 Mohammad bin Khalifa Al Khalifa (-1974).
 Ali bin Khalifa Al Khalifa – Deputy Prime Minister. He married Zayn bint Khalid Al Khalifa with whom he has three sons and one daughter:
 Khalifa bin Ali Al Khalifa
 Isa bin Ali Al Khalifa
 Minwa bint Ali Al Khalifa
 Khalid bin Ali Al Khalifa
 Salman bin Khalifa Al Khalifa
 Lulwa bint Khalifa Al Khalifa – honorary president of the Al Noor beneficence society. She married Rashid bin Khalifa Al Khalifa (1952-), artist and patron of the arts. They have four sons and three daughters.
 Noor bint Rashid Al Khalifa
 Khalifa bin Rashid Al Khalifa
 Hassa bint Rashid Al Khalifa
 Abdulla bin Rashid Al Khalifa
 Aysha bint Rashid Al Khalifa
 Mohammed bin khlaifa Al Khalifa

Death
Prince Khalifa Bin Salman Al Khalifa experienced various health problems. In September 2019, he went to Germany for treatment, and returned to Bahrain in March 2020. He headed the cabinet last time in July 2020 and went to the US for treatment in August 2020.

Prince Khalifa Bin Salman Al Khalifa died at the Mayo Clinic in Rochester, Minnesota on 11 November 2020 at the age of 84, 13 days before his 85th birthday. Serving 50 years and 11 months in office, he was the world's longest serving prime minister in history at the time of his death. Bahraini authorities have ordered a seven-day national mourning period with flags half-masted and government institutions closed for three days. Bangladesh declared November 17 as the day of state mourning with flags half-masted. He was buried at Hunainiyah Cemetery in Riffa on 11 November 2020.

Honours
Foreign honours
 : Honorary Grand Commander of the Order of the Defender of the Realm (SMN, 30 January 2001)
 : Order of Sikatuna (7 November 2001)
 : Knight Grand Cross of the Order of Isabella the Catholic (4 December 1981)

See also
Cabinet of Bahrain

References

External links

Khalifa's biography – official website of the Ministry of Foreign Affairs of the Kingdom of Bahrain
Bahrainprimeminister.net – website about Khalifa and his family)

1935 births
2020 deaths
Commanders First Class of the Order of the Dannebrog
Grand Collars of the Order of Lakandula
Grand Officers of the National Order of the Cedar
Grand Officiers of the Légion d'honneur
Khalifa
Knights Grand Cross of the Order of Isabella the Catholic
People of the Bahraini uprising of 2011
Prime Ministers of Bahrain
People named in the Pandora Papers
Sons of monarchs